Heniochus varius, the horned bannerfish or humphead bannerfish, is a species of marine ray-finned fish, a butterflyfish belonging to the family Chaetodontidae, native from the central Indo-Pacific area.

Description
It has the typical deep-bodied and highly compressed body, typical of butterflyfishes.

The horned bannerfish is told apart from its congeners by the adults having a pair of obvious horns on the forehead, just above the eyes and a prominent bump on the forehead. The predominant colour on the body is brown to blackish broken by a thin white band behind the head and a second running from the spiny part of the dorsal fin to the caudal peduncle. The two white stripes create a triangle of the base colour on the body. The dorsal fin has 11 spines and 22-25 soft rays while the anal fin contains 3 spines and 17-18 soft rays.

Distribution and habitat
The horned bannerfish is widespread throughout the tropical and subtropical waters of the central Indo-Pacific from Indonesia to Polynesia and from south Japan to New-Caledonia.

It inhabits areas rich in coral in shallow lagoons and external reef slopes from the surface to a depth of 30 meters.

Biology
The horned bannerfish is a solitary fish but it can live in pairs or even in small groups.
Its diet is varied and consists of coral polyps and various benthic invertebrates.

Taxonomy
Heniochus varius was first formally described as Taurichthys varius in 1829 by the French anatomist Georges Cuvier (1769-1832) with the type locality given as Ambon Island in Indonesia.

Conservation status
In some geographic areas, the horned bannerfish is occasionally harvested for the aquarium trade, however the species does not currently appear threatened is listed as Least Concern (LC) by the IUCN.

References

External links
 

varius
Fish described in 1829
Taxa named by Georges Cuvier